Teams from Yugoslavia first participated at the Olympic Games in 1920. Previously, several athletes from Croatia, Slovenia and northern Serbian province Vojvodina had competed for Austria or Hungary when those countries were part of the Empire of Austria-Hungary. A small team of two athletes had competed distinctly for Serbia at the 1912 Summer Olympics.

Yugoslavia has been the designation for Olympic teams from three distinct national entities:
 Kingdom of Yugoslavia (officially called the Kingdom of Serbs, Croats and Slovenes until 1929) from 1920 to 1936
 Socialist Federal Republic of Yugoslavia from 1948 to the 1992 Winter Olympics
 Federal Republic of Yugoslavia, formed as a joint state by only Montenegro and Serbia after the breakup of Yugoslavia, from 1992 to 2002 (due to UN ban allowed to compete as Independent Olympic Participants at the 1992 Summer Olympics and was not allowed to compete at 1994 Winter Olympics)

Two of the successor nations (Croatia and Slovenia) began to compete as independent teams at the Olympics starting at the 1992 Winter Games and Bosnia and Herzegovina at the 1992 Summer Games and as of the 2008 Summer Olympics, all six successor nations, former socialist republics, have participated independently. Kosovo, a former autonomous province, made its Olympic debut as an independent national team at the 2016 Summer Olympics.

Timeline of participation 
The Yugoslav Olympic Committee was established in Zagreb in 1919 (recognized by the IOC in 1920), before moving to Belgrade in 1927, and it took the place of the Serbian Olympic Committee in the Association of National Olympic Committees. During the dissolution of Yugoslavia, several new committees were formed in the break-away countries. The Federal Republic of Yugoslavia, consisting of the Republic of Serbia and the Republic of Montenegro, participated at the Games since 1996. At the 1996 and 2000 Games, the nation was designated with the same code, Yugoslavia (YUG), as the defunct SFRY. It was rechartered as the State Union of Serbia and Montenegro in 2003 with there being no territorial changes. The Serbia and Montenegro (SCG) designation and code were used at the 2004 Games.

Hosted Games 
Yugoslavia has hosted the Games on one occasion.

Medal tables 

*Red border colour indicates the games were held on home soil.
*Yugoslavia hosted the 1984 Winter Olympics in Sarajevo, now part of Bosnia and Herzegovina.

Medals by Summer Games

Medals by Winter Games

Medals by summer sport 

As Independent Olympic Participants

Medals by winter sport

List of medalists

Summer Olympics 

As Federal Republic of Yugoslavia 

As Independent Olympic Participants

Winter Olympics

See also
 List of flag bearers for Yugoslavia at the Olympics
 :Category:Olympic competitors for Yugoslavia
 Yugoslavia at the Paralympics
 List of Yugoslav Olympic medalists

References

External links